The Jiang Nan subtropical evergreen forests ecoregion (WWF ID: IM0118) covers the mountainous divide between the lower Yangtze River and the coastal plain of South China.  The region is also a climatic divide between the temperate valleys of the north and the subtropical forests of the south.   The region is important for biodiversity and endemic species.  The rugged limestone karst hills have been relatively protected from conversion to agriculture, and support specialized plant and animal communities.

Location and description 

The ecoregion ranges over the Nanling Mountains of Southern China, from the Yunnan–Guizhou Plateau in the west, to the coast of the South China Sea in the east.  The mountains separate the lower Yangtze River watershed to the north from the coastal plain to the south.   Parts of the mountains sit on granite, but much of the region is limestone, with distinctive pinnacles and karst terrain.  Elevations range from 500 meters to 1,500 meters.

Climate 
The climate of the ecoregion is Humid subtropical climate, hot wet summer (Köppen climate classification (Cfa)). This climate is characterized by large seasonal temperature differentials. Precipitation is generally highest in the summer.

Flora 
The forests of the region are subtropical, characterized by evergreen chinquapin (Castanopsis), oak (Quercus), and Schima (an evergreen member of the tea tree family, Theaceae); Laurels are common in the understory. Elevations below 1,000 meters feature semi-deciduous forests dominated by ring-cupped oak (Quercus glauca), Cinnamomum, Chinese elm (Ulmus parvifolia), and Bridelia. Bamboo is also an important tree in the regional forests. Most of the lowland forests have been cleared.

Fauna 
The area supports a number of vulnerable mammals, including the critically endangered white-headed langur (Trachypithecus poliocephalus leucocephalus), the endangered François' langur (T. francoisi), and the near-threatened mainland serow (Capricornis milneedwardsii). Over 400 species of birds have been recorded in the ecoregion.

See also 
 List of ecoregions in China

References 

Ecoregions of China
Indomalayan ecoregions
Tropical and subtropical moist broadleaf forests